Steve Cross may refer to:
Steve Cross (footballer), born 1959, English footballer
Steve Cross (musician) of Remote Control Records
Stephen E. Cross, Executive Vice President for Research at the Georgia Institute of Technology
Stephen Cross, Australian actor
Steve Cross (comedian), British comedian